Izates II (Greek: Ἰζάτης, ; ca. 1-54 CE) was king of the Parthian client kingdom of Adiabene from approximately 30 to 54. He is notable for converting to Judaism. He was the son of Queen Helena of Adiabene and Monobaz I of Adiabene. Queen Helena was also said to be the wife of King Abgarus of Edessa and thus the queen of Edessa too.

During his youth Izates was sent by his father to the court of King Abinergaos I of Characene in Charax Spasinu. While in Charax Izates became acquainted with a Jewish merchant named Ananias, who familiarized him with the tenets of the Jewish religion, in which he became deeply interested. Izates married King Abinergaos' daughter Symacho who had been converted to Judaism through the efforts of Ananias. His mother had been previously won over to Judaism without his knowledge. On returning home and ascending the throne on the death of his father (c. 31 CE), Izates discovered the conversion of his mother; and he himself intended to adopt Judaism, and even to submit to circumcision. He was, however, dissuaded from this step both by his teacher Ananias and by his mother, but was ultimately persuaded thereto by another Jew, Eleazar.

For some time Izates enjoyed peace; and he was so highly respected that he was chosen as arbitrator between the Parthian king Artabanus II and his rebellious nobles (c. 39 CE). But when several of Izates' relatives openly acknowledged their conversion to Judaism, some of the nobles of Adiabene secretly induced Abia, an Arab king, to declare war against him. Izates defeated his enemy, who in despair committed suicide. The nobles then conspired with Vologases, King of Parthia, but the latter was at the last moment prevented from carrying out his plans, and Izates continued to reign undisturbed for a total of twenty-four years.

Izates died around 54 CE. His mother Helena survived him for only a short time. He left twenty-four sons and twenty-four daughters. Izates was succeeded by his older brother Monobaz II, who sent Izates' remains and those of Queen Helena to Jerusalem for burial.

References

Sources
Gottheil, Richard and Isaac Broydé. "Izates". Jewish Encyclopedia. Funk and Wagnalls, 1901–1906.

 

Kings of Adiabene
Converts to Judaism from paganism
Judaism in Adiabene
AD 1 births
54 deaths
Jewish royalty
Cultural assimilation
1st-century monarchs in the Middle East
Jewish monarchs
1st-century Jews
Vassal rulers of the Parthian Empire